Farmers is an unincorporated community in Clinton County, in the U.S. state of Ohio.

History
A former variant name was Farmers Station. Farmers Station had its start when the railroad was extended to that point but the town site was not officially platted. A post office called Farmers Station was established in 1859, and remained in operation until 1910.

References

Unincorporated communities in Clinton County, Ohio
Unincorporated communities in Ohio